Bobo Motion is an album by jazz percussionist Willie Bobo recorded in 1967 and released on the Verve label.

Reception

The AllMusic review by Thom Jurek states "Bobo Motion is one of percussionist Willie Bobo's best-known recordings of the 1960s... the grooves are tighter and more sophisticated, and the drumming is mixed way up above an uncredited smaller combo... The tune selection is also weirder and reflects the range of Bobo' eclectic tastes, and turns more firmly toward jazz... Recommended".

Track listing
 "Up, Up & Away" (Jimmy Webb) - 1:57
 "Ain't That Right" (Arthur Sterling) - 2:37
 "Midnight Sun" (Lionel Hampton, Johnny Mercer) - 2:09
 "Cute" (Neal Hefti) - 1:53
 "I Don't Know" (Sonny Henry) - 2:34
 "Tuxedo Junction" (Julian Dash, Buddy Feyne, Erskine Hawkins) - 2:17
 "Evil Ways" (Sonny Henry) - 2:41
 "Show Me" (Joe Tex) - 2:16
 "Black Coffee" (Sonny Burke, Paul Francis Webster) - 2:44
 "Night Walk" (Steve Huffsteter) - 3:07
 "La Bamba" (Traditional) - 2:08  
Recorded in New York City on July 20 (tracks 4, 6 & 9-11)  at Van Gelder Studio in Englewood Cliffs, NJ on July 27 (tracks 1-3, 5, 7 & 8), 1967

Personnel
Willie Bobo - timbales
Clarence Henry - guitar, arranger
Bert Keys - arranger
Uncredited musicians

References

Verve Records albums
Willie Bobo albums
1967 albums
Albums produced by Teddy Reig
Albums recorded at Van Gelder Studio